Malle Leis (7 July 1940 – 9 August 2017) was an Estonian painter and graphic artist. Her works mostly represent abstract forms in nature, including flowers, fruits, and vegetables. She developed a silk screen technique that became her trademark.

Early life and education 
Malle Leis was born on July 7, 1940 in the town Viljandi, Estonia, a country on the Baltic Sea across from Finland. Leis began her education at the Tartu Art School attending from 1958 to 1961 and attended the Estonian Academy of Arts (also called Art Institute of Tallinn, see Wiki for associated names in past) from 1961 to 1967. Leis graduated from the stage design department in 1967 and was able to be recognized as one of the original members of ANK '64.

In 1964, a group of young artists in Tallinn formed an organization called ANK '64. Original members of ANK' 64 included students of the art institute, Malle Leis, Tõnis Vint, Jüri Arrak, Kristiina Kaasik, Tõnis Laanemaa, Marju Mutsu, Enno Ootsing, Tiiu Pallo-Vaik, Vello Tamm, and Aili Vint. The small group aimed to hold exhibitions outside the official system, to change theoretical ideas, and to organize private seminars on modern art. Each of these goals were being neglected by the art institute, and ANK '64 worked to change that. The small group influenced many younger beginner artists. Many artists argued that ANK '64 played more of a role in artistic development than the institute would have. Over the years, ANK '64 offered various intense exhibitions, lectures, performances, and other activities to young students. With being involved in this group, Leis became very familiar with Western contemporary art. Leis preferred working in abstract in the early sixties, but eventually developed an interest in pop art towards the end of the decade.

Artwork

Mediums 
Leis typically worked with oil, watercolor, and serigraphs, establishing herself not only as a painter, but also as a printmaker.

Styles in the 1960s 
Leis' was highly influenced when being part of ANK '64, and mostly worked with an abstraction in the beginning of her career, but quickly moved to pop art style by the end of the 1960s. One of her early works was Exchange, a piece using oil and watch parts on canvas, done in 1968. Leis combined a background of geometric forms with pop elements. The juxtaposition of geometry and pop show Leis' knowledge and influence from Western contemporary art. The two male heads in the painting are portraits of her husband, Villu Jõvega.

Styles in the 1970s and 1980s 
Leis began to paint large and bright flowers and vegetables in the 1970s, occasionally adding in human figures or horses. Leis' 1972 painting Sunlight Triptych shows striking red poppies and yellow daffodils against a flat blue background. She was likely inspired by Andy Warhol's 1964 series, Flowers, but still has her own unique style by painting a more detailed flower. In Leis' 1977 painting The Longest Day, Leis stretches tulips across the black canvas and places a human head in the bottom corner. The flowers are larger than the head, creating a dominant presence. The colorful flowers form an idea of life and happiness, but the head in the corner has been reduced to an object, simply gazing into space with an emotionless stare. These styles continued into the early 1980s. Leis began working with watercolors and silk screening in this time as well. Leis' husband helped her to develop her silk screening process, in which she would use ten to twenty different colors in each print. Her screen printed works had oriental resemblances, possibly inspired by Japanese artist Ogata Kōrin. Leis' screen printing technique quickly became her trademarked style.

Awards

Order of the White Star 
Leis was awarded the Order of the White Star, IV Class in 2001. The Order of the White Star was instituted in 1936 to commemorate the fight of the Estonian people for freedom. The Order of the White Star is bestowed on Estonian citizens to give recognition for services rendered in state public service or local government and on foreigners for services rendered to the Estonian state.

List of exhibitions and collections

Selected one-person exhibitions (1968-1989, 2014) 

 1968: Art Salon, Estonian Union of Artists, Tallinn, Estonia
 1973: House of Artists, Estonian Union of Artists, Tartu, Estonia
 1974: Theater Lydia Koidula, Parnu, Estonia
 1975: Art Salon, Estonian Union of Artists, Tallinn, Estonia
 1975: Gallery Arsenal Zapiecek, Ponsan, Poland
 1975: Gallery Arsenal Zapiecek, Warsaw, Poland
 1980: Museum of Art, Tallinn, Estonia
 1981: Russian Images, ltd., Pittsburgh, Pennsylvania, USA
 1984: Draakon Gallery, Tallinn, Estonia
 1984: Galerie im Zentrum, Luckenwalde, East Germany
 1984: International Images, ltd., Sewickley, Pennsylvania, USA
 1988: Akademgorodok, Novosibirsk, Russia
 1988: Audiovisual Gallery, Limerick, Ireland
 1988: University of Tartu, Tartu, Estonia
 1989: Harjupaviljonki, Heinola, Finland
 1989: International Images, ltd., Sewickley, Pennsylvania, USA
This exhibition held sixty of Leis' works, including oils, watercolors, and serigraphs. At the time, it was the most extensive collection of Leis' art ever shown in the United States.
 2014-2015:  Tartu Art Museum, Tartu, Estonia
This exhibition was open for about three months and featured an overview of Leis' artwork.

Selected group exhibitions (1970-1989) 

 1970: First Riga Watercolor Triennial, Riga, Latvia
 1971: II Graphics Triennial, Tallinn, Estonia
 1972: International Biennial of Graphic Art, Krakow, Poland
 1972: Graphics of Estonia, Italy
 1978: International Meeting of Fine Art Dealers, Washington, D.C., USA
 1978: Lazarus Assembly Centre, Ohio, USA
 1978: Pratt Institute Gallery, New York, USA
 1978: Pratt Manhattan Center, New York, USA
 1978: Russian Images, ltd., Sewickley, Pennsylvania, USA
 1979: Boston World Art Exhibition, Boston, Massachusetts, USA
 1979: Fourth Riga Watercolor Triennial, Tallinn, Estonia
 1979: International Meeting of Fine Art Dealers, Washington, D.C., USA
 1979: St. Mary's College, St. Mary's City, Maryland, USA
 1980: Center Gallery, Lewisburg, Pennsylvania, USA
 1980: Georgia Southern College, Statesboro, Georgia, USA
 1980: V Graphics Triennial, Tallinn, Estonia
 1980: International Art Exposition, New York, USA
 1980: Kilcawley Center Art Gallery, Youngstown, Ohio, USA
 1980: Western Carolina University, Cullouhee, USA
 1981: Augusta College, Augusta, Georgia, USA
 1981: Austin College, Sherman, Texas, USA
 1981: International Art Exposition, New York, USA
 1981: International Biennial of Graphic Art and Painting, West Germany
 1981: University Museum, Oxford, Mississippi, USA
 1982: Association for the Advancement of Baltic Studies, St. Paul, Minnesota, USA
 1982: Center Gallery, Lewisburg, Pennsylvania, USA
 1982: Contemporary Russian Art Center of America, New York, USA
 1982: Fifth Riga Watercolor Triennial, Riga, Latvia
 1982: Georgia Southwestern College, Americus, Georgia, USA
 1982: International Images, ltd., Sewickley, Pennsylvania, USA
 1982: Lutheran Brotherhood Gallery, Minneapolis, Minnesota, USA
 1982: McKissick Museum, Columbia, South Carolina, USA
 1982: Santa Fe Community College, Gainesville, Florida, USA
 1982: University of Northern Arizona, Flagstaff, Arizona, USA
 1983: Hunt Institute for Botanical Documentation, Pittsburgh, Pennsylvania, USA
 1983: VI Graphics Triennial, Tallinn, Estonia, USA
 1983: Washington Cathedral, Washington, D.C., USA
 1984: The Arts Club of Washington, Washington, D.C., USA
 1984: Chicago International Art Exposition, Chicago, Illinois, USA
 1984: Glen Helene Association, Yellow Springs, Ohio, USA
 1984: Missoula Museum of Arts, Missoula, Montana, USA
 1984: The Paine Art Center, Oshkosh, Wisconsin, USA
 1984: Thames Science Center, New London, Connecticut, USA
 1984: Strybing Arboretum, San Francisco, California, USA
 1984-1985: Kunstverein für die Rheinlande und Westfalen und Städtische Kunsthalle, Düsseldorf, West Germany
 1985: Grinnell College, Grinnell, Iowa, USA
 1985: Kunstverein Hannover, Hannover, West Germany
 1985: Muckenthaler Cultural Center, Fullerton, California, USA
 1985: Rauma 85 Biennial, Rauma, Finland
 1985: Santa Cruz City Museum, Santa Cruz, California, USA
 1985: Staatsgalerie Stuttgart, Stuttgart, West Germany
 1985: Szepmuveszeti Museum, Budapest, Hungary
 1985: University of Colorado Museum, Boulder, Colorado, USA
 1986: VII Graphics Triennial, Tallinn, Estonia
 1986: Kieler Stadtmuseum, Kiel, West Germany
 1988: Indiana University Art Museum, Bloomington, Indiana, USA
 1988: Sydney, Australia
 1989: Cultural Center, Trento, Italy
 1989: VII Graphics Triennial, Tallinn, Estonia
 1989: Melbourne, Australia

Selected museum collections
 Cremona Foundation, Maryland, USA
 Estonian Art Museum, Tallinn, Estonia
 Grinnell College, Grinnell, Iowa, USA
 Hunt Institute for Botanical Documentation, Pittsburgh, Pennsylvania, USA
 Library of Congress, Washington, D.C., USA
 Museum of Art, Tartu, Estonia
 Museum of Modern Art, New York, USA
 Museum Lodz, Lodz, Poland
 Museum Ludwig, Cologne, West Germany
 Museum Narodowe We Wroclawiu, Warsaw, Poland
 Pushkin Museum of Fine Arts, Moscow, Russia
 Szepmuveszeti Museum, Budapest, Hungary
 The Russian Museum, Leningrad, Russia
 The Tretyakov Gallery, Moscow, Russia

References

Other references 
Malle Leis on Art Net

1940 births
2017 deaths
20th-century Estonian painters
21st-century Estonian painters
20th-century Estonian women artists
21st-century Estonian women artists
People from Viljandi
Estonian printmakers
Recipients of the Order of the White Star, 4th Class
Estonian women painters
Burials at Metsakalmistu